ABC is a 2007 album by Chinese-American rapper MC Jin. ABC is Jin's fourth studio album, and his first Cantonese studio album. It was released on February 20, 2007. In 2008 the album was re-released by Universal Music Hong Kong with different album art.

Background
The album is almost entirely in Cantonese and produced by American hip-hop group Far East Movement. "ABC" stands for "American Born Chinese".

The first single from this album is "ABC."  A music video was shot for it and debuted on MTV Chi on January 26, 2007.  

The second single is "Yum Dum Cha" and Jin filmed a music video for it on May 16. Yum Dum Cha was released on YouTube on July 18, 2007.

The song "HK Superstar" featuring Daniel Wu was included in the soundtrack of the 2013 movie Fast & Furious 6.

Track listing

Hong Kong Edition Bonus

HK Edition DVD
1. ABC [Music Video] 
2. 香港 Superstar (ft. 吳彥祖) [Music Video] 
3. 飲啖茶 [Music Video] 
4. 喂喂搵邊位 [Music Video] 
5. 搵兩餐 (ft. Ken Oak) [Music Video] 
6. 上堂時間 [Music Video]

References

External links

ABC MC Jin - Apple Music

2007 albums
Cantonese-language albums
MC Jin albums